Hildur Knútsdóttir (born 16 June 1984) is an Icelandic writer and politician. In 2016, she won the Icelandic Literary Prize for children's books for her novel Vetrarhörkur (Winter Frost). The book has appeared in French as Dernier hiver (2018) and in Czech as Krvavá zima (2018).

Publications

 Sláttur (2011)
 Spádómurinn (2012)
 Ævintýraeyjan (2014)
 Draugaljósið (2015)
 Vetrarfrí (2015)
 Vetrarhörkur (2016)
 Doddi: Bók sannleikans with Þórdís Gísladóttir (2016)
 Doddi: Ekkert rugl! with Þórdís Gísladóttir (2017)
 Ljónið (2018)
 Orðskýringar (2018)
 Nornin (2019)
 Hingað og ekki lengra with Þórdís Gísladóttir (2020)
 Skógurinn (2020)

Political career
In March 2017, Hildur served briefly as a member of parliament for the Left-Green Movement to relieve Kolbeinn Óttarsson Proppé. In 2018, she left the party, citing dissatisfaction with a lack of progress in negotiations between the state and the Icelandic Association of Midwives.

References

1984 births
Living people
Hildur Knutsdottir
Hildur Knutsdottir
Hildur Knutsdottir
Hildur Knutsdottir